Scotia was a barque that was built in 1872 as the Norwegian whaler Hekla. She was purchased in 1902 by William Speirs Bruce and refitted as a research vessel for use by the Scottish National Antarctic Expedition. After the expedition, she served as a sealer, patrol vessel and collier. She was destroyed by fire in January 1916.

Description

History
Hekla was built as a barque in 1872 by Jørgensen & Knudsen, Drammen for S. S. Svendsen of Sandefjord. She was used as a sealer, making voyages to the east coast of Greenland from 1872 to 1882 and to Scoresby Sound in 1892. In 1896, she was sold to N. Bugge, Tønsberg. She was sold in 1898 to A/S Sæl- og Hvalfangerskib Hekla, Christiania and was placed under the management of M. C. Tvethe. Hekla was sold in 1900 to A/S Hecla, Sandefjord, operated under the management of Anders Marcussen.

In 1902, she was purchased by William Speirs Bruce for kr 45,000 (£2,650). She was renamed Scotia and was rebuilt by the Ailsa Shipbuilding Company for use as a research vessel by the Scottish National Antarctic Expedition. A new steam engine was fitted, which drove a single screw propeller. The work was supervised by Fridtjof Nansen. When the conversion of the ship was complete, she was inspected by Colin Archer, who had prepared Fram for Nansen's 1893 expedition to the Arctic. Thomas Robertson was appointed captain of Scotia. He had twenty years' experience of sailing in the Arctic and Antarctic on board the whalers Active and Balaena. Sea trials of the rebuilt ship were conducted in August 1902.

Scotia sailed on 2 November 1902 for the Antarctic. She arrived at the Falkland Islands on 6 January 1903, She then sailed to Laurie Island, South Orkney Islands where she arrived on 25 March. Scotia overwintered in Scotia Bay, where she was frozen in for eight months. She departed for the Falkland Islands on 27 November, en route for Buenos Aires, Argentina where she underwent a refit. Scotia returned to Laurie Island on 14 February 1904, sailing eight days later for the Weddell Sea. She departed from the Antarctic on 21 March. Calling at Saint Helena in June, she arrived at Millport, Cumbrae, Ayrshire on 21 July, and was escorted by a number of ships to her final destination of Gourock, Renfrewshire.

Following the expedition, it was planned that Scotia would see further use by the universities of Scotland as a research vessel. However, she was sold by auction in an effort to recoup some of the costs of the expedition. She served as a sealer and whaler until 1913, operating off the coast of Greenland. A Marconi wireless was installed to enable her to communicate with stations on the coast of Labrador and Newfoundland. Following this, she became a collier, sailing between the United Kingdom and France. On 18 January 1916, she caught fire and was burnt out in the Bristol Channel off Sully Island, Glamorgan. Her crew survived.

Legacy
Scotia was depicted on a 5/- stamp issued by the Falkland Islands.
She was also depicted on two stamps issued by the British Antarctic Territory.

The Hekla Sound in northeast Greenland was named by the ill-fated 1906-1908 Denmark expedition after this ship, referring to  its original name.

References

Sources
 

1872 ships
Ships built in Norway
Barques
Sailing ships of Norway
Merchant ships of Norway
Research vessels of the United Kingdom
Sailing ships of Scotland
Steamships of the United Kingdom
Merchant ships of the United Kingdom
Weather ships
World War I merchant ships of the United Kingdom
Maritime incidents in 1916
Ship fires
1872 in Norway
1902 in Scotland
Maritime incidents in Wales
1916 disasters in the United Kingdom
History of Glamorgan
1916 in Wales